= Irish War =

Irish War may refer to:

- Irish War of Independence (1919–1921)
- Irish Civil War (1922–1923)
- The Troubles (late 1960s–1998)
